The 2014 Football West season was the first season under the new competition format in Western Australia. The overall premier for the new structure qualified for the National Premier Leagues finals series, competing with the other state federation champions in a final knockout tournament to decide the National Premier Leagues Champion for 2014.

Pre-season changes

League tables

2014 National Premier Leagues WA
The 2014 National Premier Leagues season was the second season of the new national structure, and the first season with Western Australia participating. The highest division in WA replaced the previous Football West Premier League competition, which has been run in one form or another for over a century. The overall premier for the new structure qualifies for the National Premier Leagues finals series, competing with the other state federation champions in a final knockout tournament to decide the National Premier Leagues Champion for 2014.

It was played over 22 rounds as a full double round robin from March to August 2014.

A relegation system for the lowest team to the State League Division 1 was introduced after the 2015 season, and was subject to whether the top team from the State League Division 1 met certain NPL Eligibility Criteria.

Finals

2014 WA State League Division 1

The 2014 WA State League Division 1 season, known as the All Flags State League Division 1 for sponsorship reasons, was the second level domestic football competition in Western Australia.

2014 WA State League Division 2

The 2014 WA State League Division 2 season, known as the All Flags State League Division 2 for sponsorship reasons, was the third level domestic football competition in Western Australia. Joondalup United finished the season undefeated.

2014 Women's State League Premier Division

The highest tier domestic football competition in Western Australia is known as the BankWest Women's State League Premier Division for sponsorship reasons.  The 8 teams play each other three times, for a total of 21 rounds, and with a promotion/relegation system for the bottom team with the State League Division 1. Northern Redbacks won the Women's State Cup.

2014 Cool Ridge Cup

Western Australian soccer clubs competed in 2014 for the Football West State Cup, known that year as the Cool Ridge Cup for sponsorship reasons. Clubs entered from the newly formed National Premier Leagues WA, the two divisions of the State League, as well as a limited number of teams from various divisions of the 2014 Sunday League competition.

This knockout competition was won by Bayswater City, their second title.

The competition also served as Qualifying rounds for the 2014 FFA Cup. In addition to the A-League club Perth Glory, the two finalists – Bayswater City and Stirling Lions – qualified for the final rounds of the 2014 FFA Cup, entering at the Round of 32.

References

2014 in Australian soccer
2014